Sabina Vajrača (born 30 May 1977) is an American film director, screenwriter, and film producer.

Vajraća is best known for having directed and produced the 2005 Bosnian documentary Back to Bosnia.

Biography
Sabina Vajrača was born to a Bosniak family in Banja Luka, Bosnia and Herzegovina, which then a part of the Socialist Federal Republic of Yugoslavia, where she lived until the Bosnian War started in 1992. She started her artistic life as a poet and a short-story writer, completing her first novel at ten years of age. It involved a girl, a dog and a boy who saves the world. It was a huge hit among her friends.

By thirteen she had read all the books available at her local children's library and she persuaded the librarian to give her a card for the adult branch. Around the same time she decided to become a film director. She made plans to attend the Prague Film School and eventually win an Oscar.

At the age of fourteen she found herself on a losing side of a war. With one suitcase and a book under her arm she left her home, her family and her plans behind. She was never to see most of the people she knew thus far again.

She spent the next two years in Croatia. It was there that, at sixteen, she saw her first play. She decided then and there to spend the rest of her life in theatre. Desperate to start as soon as possible, she turned to one thing she knew she could do – write, and founded a theatre magazine Teatralije with four of her friends. She made plans to attend the Academy of Dramatic Arts in Zagreb and eventually work for the national theatre. Two years later she was standing in Tampa International Airport, holding a distinct blue and white refugee bag.

Sabina currently lives in New York City.

Film
Back To Bosnia – 2005
Apparition (2009)
Smoking Kills (2011)
Summer Abroad (planned)

Television
Generations Matter (ESPN)

References

1977 births
Living people
American film directors
American film producers
American Muslims
American screenwriters
American women film directors
Bosnia and Herzegovina Muslims
Bosnia and Herzegovina emigrants to the United States
Bosniaks of Bosnia and Herzegovina
People from Banja Luka